Poliana Aparecida de Paula (born October 18, 1989 in Piraju) is a Brazilian slalom canoer who has competed since the late 2000s. She was eliminated in the semifinals of the K-1 event at the 2008 Summer Olympics in Beijing, finishing in 14th place.

References

1989 births
Living people
Brazilian female canoeists
Canoeists at the 2008 Summer Olympics
Olympic canoeists of Brazil
21st-century Brazilian women
People from Piraju